List of airships of the United States Navy identifies the airships of the United States Navy by type, identification, and class. The fabric-clad rigid airships were treated as the equivalent of commissioned warships, and all others were treated more like aircraft.

Rigid airships

Fabric-clad rigid airships
 - served 1923-25, lost 3 September 1925 due to structural failure while in line squalls, 14 killed
(ZR-2) - British-built as R38, lost 24 August 1921 before US Navy acceptance (and before official use of the ZR-2 designation) due to severe control inputs at low altitude and high speed far in excess of structural strength, 44 killed including 16 USN personnel
 - German-built as LZ 126, served 1924-39 (decommissioned 1932, and dismantled 1940)

 - aircraft carrier served 1931-33, lost 4 April 1933 in a storm, 73 killed
 - aircraft carrier served 1933-35, lost 12 February 1935 due to structural failure, 2 killed

Metal rigid airships
ZMC-2, a metalclad-airship built by the Aircraft Development Corp - 1929-41 (scrapped)

Semi-rigid airships

O-1 Airship

Blimps (non-rigid airships)

A class blimp (experimental)
B class blimp (patrol & training) 
C class blimp (patrol)
D class blimp (patrol)
E class blimp (trainer)
F class blimp (trainer)
G class blimp (trainer & utility airship) (ZNN-G) (ZGT)
(ZPG-2, ZPG-2W)
H class blimp (observation)
J class blimp (trainer)
K-1 blimp (experimental)  (ZNP-K)
K class blimp (anti-submarine patrol) (ZNP-K)
(ZSG-2); (ZSG-3); (ZSG-4); (ZP5K)
L class blimp (trainer) (ZNN-L)
M class blimp (anti-submarine patrol) (ZNP-M)
N class blimp (anti-submarine patrol & AEW) (ZPN-1. ZPG-1)
ZPG-3W, largest blimp ever built
TC class blimp - transferred from US Army
MZ-3A (experimental) first Navy airship in 40 years

Gallery

See also
British blimps operated by the USN
French Blimps operated by the USN
Piasecki PA-97
US Army airships

Footnotes

References
 Allen, Hugh, "The Story of the Airship (non-rigid), Akron, Ohio, 1943
 Althoff, William F., "Sky Ships" New York, Orion Books, 1990, 
 Grossnick, Roy A., "Kite Balloons to Airships. . . the Navy's Lighter-than-air Experience,", Washington, Government Printing Office, 1986
 Higham, Robin, "The British Rigid Airship, 1908–1931: A Study in Weapons Policy," London, G.T. Foulis & Co Ltd.
 Mowthorpe, Ces, "Battle Bags," Phoenix Mill, Far Thrupp, Stroud, Gloucestershire, England, Allan Sutton Publishing, 1995
 Shock, James R., "U.S. Navy Airships 1915-1962, Edgewater, Florida, Atlantis Productions, 2001, 
 Vaeth, J. Gordon, "Blimps & U-Boats", Annapolis, Maryland, US Naval Institute Press, 1992, 
 Ventry, Lord & Kolesnik, Eugen M., "Airship Saga," Poole, Dorset, Britain, Blandford Press, 1982, 

United States Navy Airships
United States Navy
Airships of the United States Navy
Airships of the United States Navy